The Posthomerica (translit. tà meth᾿ Hómēron; lit. "Things After Homer") is an epic poem in Greek hexameter verse by Quintus of Smyrna. Probably written in the 3rd century AD, it tells the story of the Trojan War, between the death of Hector and the fall of Ilium.

The first four books, covering the same ground as the Coming of Memnon of Arctinus of Miletus, describe the doughty deeds and deaths of Penthesileia the Amazon, of Memnon, son of the Morning, and of Achilles; and the funeral games in honour of Achilles.

Books five through twelve, covering the same ground as the Little Iliad of Lesches, span from the contest between Ajax and Odysseus for the arms of Achilles, the death of Ajax by suicide after his loss, the exploits of Neoptolemus, Eurypylus and Deiphobus, the deaths of Paris and Oenone, to the building of the wooden horse.

The remaining books, covering the same ground as Arctinus' Destruction of Troy, relate the capture of Troy by means of the wooden horse, the sacrifice of Polyxena at the grave of Achilles, the departure of the Greeks, and their dispersal by the storm.

Summary

The plot of Posthomerica begins where Homer's Iliad ends, immediately after Hector's body was regained by the Trojans. Penthesileia, a daughter of Ares, arrives at Troy with a group of Amazon warriors. They arrive from the Thermodon River. She has come to share the hardships of war and to escape her people after accidentally killing her sister; she was aiming for a stag. Priam thinks she will save Troy and kill Achilles. Andromache doesn't think Penthesileia is capable. Priam prayed to Zeus to let Penthesileia return, but he sees an eagle holding a dove, a sign that she will die. Ajax and Achilles are in the city resting. Hippoclameia tries to convince the Trojan women to fight, but Theano convinces them it is a suicidal idea. Penthesileia kills Podarces in battle. Ajax convinces Achilles that it is time to fight: Achilles kills Penthesileia by impaling her and her horse, but Achilles notices her beauty and realizes that he should have made her his wife. Thersites tells Achilles not to worry about women, Achilles eventually kills him and upsets Diomedes.

Thymoites tells Troy if they are to stay in the city, they will die, therefore everyone should leave. Priam and Paris say that fighting is the answer and Memnon, son of Dawn, and the Ethiopian army will be here soon. Polydamas says that Ethiopians will lose. Zeus thinks that tomorrow's battle will be ugly and full of death. Memnon kills Nestor’s son Antilochos in battle. Eventually, after a long and difficult struggle; Achilles kills Memnon. Dawn will not let the sun rise because she is so upset and retreats to Hades until Zeus convinces her to leave. After Achilles tells him to stop interfering in the battle, Apollo tries to shoot Achilles, wounding his ankle; this will later prove fatal. Zeus is furious with Apollo as he is not supposed to interfere in the mortal world.

The Trojans are still scared to fight the injured Achilles. Achilles dies and Paris attempts to remove his corpse. Ajax defends the body, killing Glaucos, who falls on top of Achilles. Ajax also injures Aeneas. Odysseus helps Ajax defend Achilles’ body. Ajax stuns Paris by hitting him with a rock, forcing Paris to give up his attempt to take the corpse. The Greeks successfully drive the Trojans off and rescue Achilles’ body, bringing it back to the Greek camp. Ajax is the first to eulogize Achilles, then Phoinix, Agamemnon, Briseis, and Thetis, Achilles mother. Calliope tells Thetis that her son will always be remembered. The Greeks then compete in funeral games to commemorate the death of Achilles.

There is a heated argument between Odysseus and Ajax over which one of them is most deserving of receiving Achilles armor. The Trojan prisoners are asked to decide which one of them was the better warrior during the defense of Achilles’ body. The hero that fought most bravely and valiantly will be awarded the armor. It is decided that Odysseus will receive the armor. Similar to Sophocles' play Ajax, this leads to Ajax's suicide, and Odysseus speaks his regret at the funeral. He is cremated at sea.

At this point, the gods give Eurypylus to the Trojans. Eurypylus is able to kill many Argive soldiers and drives the Argives to despair. They draw near to the ships, but Neoptolemos arrives to fight the Trojans back. Ares demoralizes the Argives, but Neoptolemos holds his ground and slays Eurypylus. He continues to kill Trojans, such that the author expresses surprise at his body count. Deiphobos challenges him, but Apollo saves the Trojans from Neoptolemos. Apollo tries to kill Neoptolemos, but Zeus threatens to destroy Ilion if he does.

The battle is halted by Calchas, who declares that the battle is not fated to end until Philoctetes joins the Argives. Philoctetes had been left on the island of Lemnos due to receiving a bite on the foot from a poisonous water snake that became infected and repulsive to the other Greeks. This scenario draws on source material from Sophocles' Philoctetes. Philoctetes is rescued from his cave. They tell him that his wound can be healed by the surgeon Podaleninos if he agrees to come with them to Troy. Although Philoctetes considers Odysseus at fault for leaving him on the island, he forgives Odysseus.

Aeneas attempts to convince the Trojans to stay within the city walls, without success. Panic, Fear and Strife arrive at the day’s battle. Philoctetes shoots Paris with his poisoned arrows, grazing him on the hand and striking him in the groin. Paris, mortally wounded, tries to get help from his first wife, Oenone, who spurns him because of his affair with Helen. Paris passes away. Priam laments that he was his second best son, and Helen curses the position he put her in. Oenone, regrets her actions and commits suicide by jumping on Paris' funeral pyre. They are buried next to one another, their headstones facing opposite ways.

The battle evens out for both sides. Apollo pushes Aeneas and Eurymachos to fight like madmen against the Greeks, pushing them back until they are rallied by Neoptolemos. The Greeks surge forwards and Aeneas manages to rally the Trojans and check the Greek advance. A dust storm settles over the battle. The next morning, the Argives hide under their shields to get to the gates of Troy, led by Odysseus. Ares gives Aeneas the strength to retaliate by throwing huge rocks. Aeneas exhorts the Trojans to leave the city, but the battle continues around the gates. Philoctetes shoots at Aeneas, but his shield protects him, allowing the arrow to hit Mimas instead.

The seer Calchas sees an omen of a hawk and dove, suggests that the Greeks try a new strategy to take Troy. Odysseus comes up with a plan to create the Trojan Horse. He gets Epeios to construct the horse. Neoptolemos and Philoctetes do not like the plan, because they prefer a more direct battle. Epeios prays to Athena. The horse causes the gods to break out in a brief fight until Zeus ends it. Neoptolemos, Menelaos, Odysseus, Sthenalos, Diomedes and Philoctetes are among those that board the horse. Agamemnon and Nestor stay behind. The Argives leave the horse and Sinon at Troy and pretend to flee. Sinon is heavily disfigured and left as a messenger. He says that the horse is a tribute to Tritogeneia, but Laocoon sees through the deception. He tries to urge the Trojans to burn the horse, but he is struck with blindness by Athena. He and his children are killed by two serpents. The Trojans attempt to sacrifice to the gods, but the sacrifices refuse to catch fire. Statues begin to weep and temples are stained with blood, but the Trojans are not impressed by these negative omens. Cassandra also knows the truth about the horse, but is cursed so that nobody believes her. She attempts to burn the horse but is prevented from doing so.

The Trojans celebrate their victory, but are left unprepared for the Argives as they exit the horse and kill the Trojans. Priam is killed by Neoptolemos. Menelaos kills Deiphobos, who has married Helen after Paris' death. Troy is burned to the ground. The women of Troy are given to the heroes of the Argives. Much of the events here are similar to the events in Euripides' Trojan Women. Ajax the Lesser rapes Cassandra in Athena's shrine, so he is killed by the gods.

The major characters
The Argives (Ἀργεĩοι).
 Agamemnon — King of Mycenae; leader of the Greeks.
 Achilles — Son of Thetis; champion of the Greeks.
 Odysseus — King of Ithaca.
 Ajax the Greater — son of Telamon, with Diomedes, he is second to Achilles in martial prowess.
 Menelaus — King of Sparta; husband of Helen and brother of Agamemnon.
 Diomedes — son of Tydeus, King of Argos.
 Nestor - King of Pylos.
 Ajax the Lesser — son of Oileus
 Calchas — Seer
 Neoptolemus — Son of Achilles
 Philoctetes — Wielder of Heracles' bow
Trojans
Aeneas — son of Anchises and Aphrodite.
Alexander (Paris) — Helen's captor.
Priam — King of Troy.
Polydamas - Son of Priam; Strategist.
Deiphobus - Brother of Hector
Cassandra - Prophetess of Troy
Hecuba - Wife of Priam; Queen of the Trojans.
Andromache - Wife of Hector
 Warriors other than those that dwell in Troy are brought in to fight as well.
Penthesileia - Amazonian queen
Memnon - King of the Aithiopians
Eurypylus - Commander of the Mysians
Major gods:
Zeus
Hera
Apollo
Aphrodite
Ares
Athena
Hermes
Poseidon
Hephaestus
Minor gods:
Eris
Iris
Thetis
Themis

Relationship to previous epics
Its style has been criticized by many scholars as subpar to Homer, but it is valuable as the earliest surviving account of this period in the Trojan War. The Iliad ends with "Such was the funeral of Hector, tamer of horses"; later poets changed this to however it might fit their needs. Quintus used it as an opening line: "Such was the funeral of Hector. And now there came an Amazon..."

The purpose of the story seems to be to complete the Iliad and give the characters a sense of closure. Many of the characters who had hated an ally in prior works, such as Philoctetes to Odysseus in Sophocles' play, now easily overcome the anger to create harmony.

Critical editions
A. Zimmermann, Quinti Smyrnaei Posthomericorum libri XIV, Leipzig 1891 (reprinted Stuttgart 1969).
F. Vian, La suite d'Homère. Texte établi et traduit par Francis Vian, I-III, Paris 1963-9.
G. Pompella, Quinti Smyrnaei Posthomerica. Olms-Weidmann, Hildesheim & New York 2002.
Alan James, Quintus of Smyrna, The Trojan War: Posthomerica, English translation, Johns Hopkins 2004.

References

External links 
 
  (translation by Arthur Sanders Way)

4th-century poems
Ancient Greek epic poems
Trojan War literature
Agamemnon